The Chapman Tripp Theatre Awards were the main theatre awards in New Zealand's capital city, Wellington, from 1992–2014, and have been succeeded by the Wellington Theatre Awards.

Established in 1992 and sponsored by law firm Chapman Tripp, the prestigious awards were a highlight in Wellington's art and social calendar. The presentations also recognised important contributions to the arts and the community. The winners were selected by a panel of Wellington theatre critics. In 2014 Chapman Tripp ended their 22 year sponsorship due to a shift in their corporate social responsibility programme.

The main theatres in Wellington such as BATS Theatre, Circa Theatre, and Downstage Theatre each had an individual Production of the Year award for their best production during the year.

Notable winners 
Winners at the Chapman Tripp Theatre Awards include the most acclaimed names in New Zealand theatre. Such names include directors such as multiple winner Colin McColl (Laureate Award, Arts Foundation of New Zealand 2007), Miranda Harcourt, Susan Wilson, Nathaniel Lees, Cathy Downes, Ross Jolly and Rachel Teaomarama House.

Best Actress winners include Jennifer Ludlam, Katherine McRae, Carmel McGlone, Grace Hoet and Madeleine Sami.

Best Actor winners include Ray Henwood, Tim Balme, Grant Tilly, Dave Fane and Peter Hambleton. In 2006, acclaimed Maori actor George Henare (NZ Laureate Award, Arts Foundation of New Zealand 2008) received a Chapman Tripp Best Actor Award for his portrayal of Willy Loman in Circa Theatre's Death of a Salesman.

Playwrights include David Geary, Briar Grace-Smith, Hone Kouka, Hori Ahipene and Kirk Torrance.

1992 awards

1993 awards

1994 awards

1995 awards

1996 awards

1997 awards

1998 awards

1999 awards

2000 awards

2001 awards

2002 awards

2003 awards

2004 awards

2005 awards

2006 awards 
The 2006 winners were announced at an award ceremony hosted by mayor Kerry Prendergast on the 7 December 2006.

2007 awards 
The 2007 winners were announced on 3 December 2007.

2008 awards 
The 2008 awards were announced on 7 December 2008.

2009 awards 
The 2009 awards were announced on 6 December 2009.

2010 awards 

The 2010 awards were announced on 5 December 2010 at Wellington Opera House. A Critics' Wildcard Award was introduced this year, for "outstanding work in an area not otherwise covered by the awards".

2011 awards 
The 2011 awards were presented at the Wellington Opera House on 4th December, as follows:

2012 awards 

The 2012 awards were presented on 9th December 2012 at the Paramount Theatre, Wellington, as follows:

2013 awards 
The 2013 awards were presented on the 15 December 2013 at the Paramount Cinema in Wellington, as follows:

2014 awards 
The 2014 awards were presented on Sunday 14 December 2014, at the Paramount Theatre in Wellington, as follows:

References 

New Zealand awards
Theatre in New Zealand
New Zealand theatre awards